The 1984 ECAC South men's basketball tournament (now known as the Colonial Athletic Association men's basketball tournament) was held March 8–10 at the JMU Convocation Center in Harrisonburg, Virginia. 

Richmond defeated Navy in the championship game, 74–55, to win their first ECAC South men's basketball tournament and, therefore, earn an automatic bid to the 1984 NCAA tournament. This was Richmond's first-ever bid to the NCAA tournament.

Bracket

References

Colonial Athletic Association men's basketball tournament
Tournament
ECAC South men's basketball tournament
ECAC South men's basketball tournament
Sports in Harrisonburg, Virginia
College basketball tournaments in Virginia